Racquetball at the 2009 World Games.

Medal table

Medalists

References

 
 

 
2009 in racquetball
Racquetball in Taiwan